This is a list of Montserratian football clubs in North American competitions. Montserratian clubs have participated in competitive international football competitions since at least 2004 when Ideal SC entered the 2004 CFU Club Championship.

No Montserratian team has won any CONCACAF competition, or won a single game in the competition, any Montserratian clubs have infrequently participated in CONCACAF tournaments due to logistical issues. The most recent appearance by a Montserratian football club in a CONCACAF club competition came in 2017 when Royal Montserrat Police Force participated in the 2017 Caribbean Club Championship.

Who qualifies for CONCACAF competitions 
Since 2018, the winner of the Montserrat Championship, the top tier of football on the island qualifies for the Caribbean Club Shield, a tertiary knockout tournament for developing Caribbean football nations. This competition is held in the spring. This also serves as a qualifying for the CONCACAF League, which played that fall. The CONCACAF League is the secondary association football competition for club football in North America. Should a team finish in the top six standings of the CONCACAF League, they qualify for the CONCACAF Champions League, which is played the following winter.

In order for a Montserratian team to reach the Champions League, they would need to win the Caribbean Club Shield and then earn a top six finish in the CONCACAF League.

Results by competition

CFU Club Championship

Appearances in CONCACAF competitions

References

External links 
 RSSSF International Club Results for North America
 Montserrat - List of Champions, RSSSF.com

 
North American football clubs in international competitions